The NBA on ABC is an American presentation of National Basketball Association (NBA) games produced by ESPN, and televised on ABC. After the ABC Sports division was integrated with its cable sister network in September 2006, broadcasts have since primarily used the NBA on ESPN branding and graphics instead of NBA on ABC name.

ABC originally broadcast NBA games from 1965 to 1973. In 2002, NBA games returned to the network as part of a contract signed with the league, along with ESPN.

ABC televises games throughout the regular season, currently starting with Saturday night game in mid December, followed by a full slate of games on Christmas Day, and continued by a slate of NBA Saturday Primetime games and NBA Sunday Showcase afternoon games from January through March. ABC then airs up to nine games during the first five weeks of the NBA playoffs, and is the exclusive broadcaster of the NBA Finals.

History

ABC gains the NBA for the first time (1965–73) 
ABC first signed a deal with the NBA to become the league's primary television partner in 1964; the network's first game telecast aired on January 3, 1965 (a game between the Boston Celtics and Cincinnati Royals). ABC's initial alliance with the NBA first came about due to ABC Sports head Roone Arledge's search for live programming that could diminish the ratings of CBS Sports Spectacular, and ABC's own anthology program, Wide World of Sports a boost with sponsors. ABC initially paid the NBA only $650,000 for the rights annually.

For much of the 1960s, ABC only televised Sunday afternoon games, including during the NBA Playoffs. This meant that ABC did not have to televise a potential NBA Finals deciding game if it were played on a weeknight. In 1969, ABC did televise Game 7 of the Los Angeles Lakers–Boston Celtics series in prime time on a weeknight. The following season, ABC aired the 1970 NBA Finals in its entirety, making it the first Finals series to have all games televised nationally.

Commentators for the original NBA on ABC included play-by-play announcers Keith Jackson and Chris Schenkel, and analysts Jack Twyman, Bob Cousy and Bill Russell. On April 8, 1967, a strike by the American Federation of Television and Radio Artists (AFTRA) forced ABC Sports producer Chuck Howard and director Chet Forte to call Game 4 of the Eastern Conference Finals between Boston Celtics and Philadelphia 76ers, as its regular announcing team were members of the union. Curt Gowdy also served on play-by-play for half of the 1967–68 season.

Jerry Gross and Jack Twyman called that particular broadcast for the network. ABC would continue to televise Christmas games through . The remainder of these broadcasts were based from Arizona Veterans Memorial Coliseum in Phoenix. Jack Twyman remained as color commentator for the broadcasts up until , when the position was assumed by Bill Russell.

By 1969, ABC's NBA contract worth only $3 million. To put things into proper perspective, in 1969, Major League Baseball's television contract with NBC was worth $16.5 million while the National Football League cost CBS about $22 million. What that meant is that ABC had made a bargain in purchasing the television rights to the NBA, considering the league's steady ratings. To give you a better idea, ABC's ratings for the NBA rose from a 6.0 in 1965 to an 8.2 in 1968.

ABC was by this time, coming increasingly under fire for what perceived to be a less than spectacular presentation of the NBA. Sports Illustrateds Frank Deford in particular, singled ABC out for their coverage of the 1971 NBA Finals. Deford felt that ABC was making a mistake in trying to cover the NBA the same way that they covered a football game, because they were two different games. On that end, Deford wrote that neither ABC's announcers nor cameras were able to isolate the important phases of the game. He added that replays were used only to second-guess officials rather than "capture the grace and precision of the performers". Meanwhile, Deford also criticized play-by-play man Chris Schenkel in regards to his failure to appreciate the nuances of the game and their halftime shows, which Deford saw not innovative or imaginative.

ABC lost the broadcast rights to the NBA to CBS after the 1972–73 season, with the network's initial tenure with the league ending with its last NBA Finals game on May 10, 1973. ABC filled the void left by losing the NBA by counterprogramming Wide World of Sports on Sundays against CBS' NBA coverage.

Regular season schedules

1960s

1970s

The dark years (1973–2002)
On December 15, 1973, ABC aired what is considered to be the first telecast of a regular season college basketball game by a major broadcast network (between UCLA and North Carolina State in St. Louis). ABC televised this game using its former NBA announcing crew of Keith Jackson and Bill Russell.

Bill Russell also provided color commentary for ABC's coverage of basketball at the Summer Olympics in 1972 and 1976. Russell worked alongside Frank Gifford, Bill Flemming (who (filled in for Gifford while he did wrestling in 1972), and Curt Gowdy.

And then in the 1977–78 NCAA Division I men's season, C.D. Chesley (who controlled the rights to the Atlantic Coast Conference (ACC) at the time) wanted NBC to televise select ACC games as part of its national package as it had done the previous few years. However, NBC wanted to feature intersectional games. This action greatly upset Chesley, who wound up selling the rights to the ACC Tournament final to ABC. ABC would televise the 1978 ACC Tournament final as part of Wide World of Sports. The game, called by Jim Lampley and Bill Russell, marked the first time Duke University's Blue Devils basketball team played on national television.

For ABC's final Summer Olympics to date, which were the 1984 games from Los Angeles, Keith Jackson provided the play–by–play alongside Digger Phelps (men) and Ann Meyers (women).

ABC wouldn't begin broadcasting college basketball on a more regular basis until January 18, 1987. In the early years of ABC's regular college basketball coverage, Keith Jackson and Dick Vitale were the primary announcing crew, while Gary Bender was the secondary play-by-play announcer behind Jackson. Meanwhile, Al Michaels did regional games during this period.

Also beginning in 1987 and continuing through 1989, ABC  broadcast the McDonald's Open. Gary Bender and Dick Vitale provided the commentary for ABC's broadcasts. Supplemental coverage was provided by TBS.

ABC Radio's coverage (1984–90) 
From the 1984–85 through 1989–90 seasons, the ABC Radio Network was the official, national radio broadcaster of NBA games, succeeding the Mutual Broadcasting System. ABC Radio was in return, supplanted by Public Interest Affiliates' (or PIA's) NBA Radio Network.

Commentators included Fred Manfra on play-by-play and Oscar Robertson (from 1984 to 1985 through 1985–86), Dick Vitale (from 1986–87 through 1989–90) and Earl Monroe (from 1988–89 through 1989–90) on color commentary. Other announcers included Marv Albert (1989 All-Star Game) and Chick Hearn (1988 All-Star Game) on play-by-play and Rod Hundley (1987 and 1989 All-Star Games), Johnny Most (1988 All-Star Game), and Dave Barnett (1986 All-Star Game) on color commentary.

ESPN outbids NBC for the NBA contract (2002–present) 

In late 2001, the NBA was in the midst of putting together a new broadcast and cable television deal. At the time, conventional wisdom was that NBC would renew its existing broadcasting contract with the league. An October 5, 2001, Sports Business Daily article cited The New York Times sports columnist Richard Sandomir regarding the possibility of ESPN joining with ABC in obtaining a portion of the contract:

The negotiations were closely watched by those in the business world, as it was the first time that a major sports league crafted a television deal in the new economic environment since the September 11 terrorist attacks a few months before. Declining ratings for NBC's NBA game telecasts had already led many to believe that the NBA's next television rights fee would be lower than previous years, and the economic recession made that a likely scenario. As predicted, NBC's offer to the league was lower than the previous agreement's amount. Had the NBA agreed to the network's offer, it would have been the first sports league to experience a decline in rights fees. However, the NBA rejected NBC's offer and after the network's exclusive negotiating period with the league expired, ABC and ESPN stepped in. On January 22, 2002, the NBA signed a six-year deal with The Walt Disney Company and Turner Sports, which renewed an existing deal with TNT and allowed ABC and ESPN to acquire the rights to air the league's games. ABC and ESPN reportedly paid an average of about US$400 million a season. Technically, ESPN pays the NBA for its broadcast rights and "buys" time on ABC to air select games (this is noted in copyright tags during the end credits at the conclusion of the telecasts, saying "The preceding program has been paid for by ESPN, Inc.") In all, the contract allowed the NBA to increase its rights fees by 25%.

NBC Sports chairman Dick Ebersol said regarding the deal:

In 2006, after ABC Sports became ESPN on ABC the NBA on ABC started to be produced by ESPN with ESPN graphics. All broadcasts have an "on ABC" suffix on their titles after this rebrand.

In June 2007, and again in October 2014, the NBA renewed its television agreement with ESPN, as well as TNT, with the current contract extending through the 2024–25 season.

2010s schedules

2014–15 schedule 
Primary commentating team: Mike Breen, Mark Jackson and Jeff Van Gundy. Secondary commentating team: Mike Tirico and Hubie Brown.

2015–16 schedule 
Saturday games called by Mike Breen, Mark Jackson and Jeff Van Gundy unless otherwise noted. Sunday games called by Mike Tirico and Hubie Brown unless otherwise noted. This was the first season of NBA Saturday Primetime, which replaced NBA Sunday Showcase doubleheaders.

2016–17 schedule 
Saturday games called by Mike Breen, Mark Jackson and Jeff Van Gundy unless otherwise noted. Sunday games called by Mark Jones and Hubie Brown unless otherwise noted.

2017–18 schedule 
Saturday games called by Mike Breen, Mark Jackson and Jeff Van Gundy unless otherwise noted. Sunday games called by Mark Jones and Hubie Brown unless otherwise noted.

2018–19 schedule 
Saturday games called by Mike Breen, Mark Jackson and Jeff Van Gundy unless otherwise noted. Sunday games called by Mark Jones and Hubie Brown unless otherwise noted.
{| class="wikitable"
! Date
! Teams
! Start times (All times Eastern)
!Notes
|-
|rowspan=3|Tuesday, December 25, 2018
|Thunder vs. Rockets
|3:00 p.m.
|NBA Christmas Game. Dave Pasch and Doris Burke on call. No sideline reporter.
|-
|76ers vs. Celtics
|5:30 p.m.
|NBA Christmas Game. Mark Jones and Hubie Brown on call. Israel Gutierrez worked sideline.
|-
|Lakers vs. Warriors
|8:00 p.m.
|NBA Christmas Game. Mike Breen, Mark Jackson and Jeff Van Gundy on call. Lisa Salters worked sideline.
|-
|rowspan=2|Saturday, January 19, 2019
|Thunder vs. 76ers
|3:30 p.m.
|NBA Saturday Primetime. Mark Jones and Hubie Brown on call. Israel Gutierrez worked sideline.
|-
|Lakers vs. Rockets
|8:30 p.m.
|NBA Saturday Primetime. Lisa Salters on sideline.
|-
|Saturday, January 26, 2019
|Warriors vs. Celtics
|8:30 p.m.
|NBA Saturday Primetime. Israel Gutierrez on sideline.
|-
|Saturday, February 2, 2019
|Lakers vs. Warriors
|8:30 p.m.
|NBA Saturday Primetime. Lisa Salters on sideline.
|-
|Sunday, February 3, 2019
|Thunder vs. Celtics
|2:00 p.m.
|NBA Sunday Showcase. Israel Gutierrez on sideline.
|-
|Saturday, February 9, 2019
|Thunder vs. Rockets
|8:30 p.m.
|NBA Saturday Primetime. Lisa Salters on sideline.
|-
|Sunday, February 10, 2019
|Lakers vs. 76ers
|3:30 p.m.
|NBA Sunday Showcase. Israel Gutierrez on sideline.
|-
|Saturday, February 23, 2019
|Rockets vs. Warriors
|8:30 p.m.
|NBA Saturday Primetime'''. Lisa Salters on sideline.
|-
|Saturday, March 2, 2019
|Warriors vs. 76ers
|8:30 p.m.
|NBA Saturday Primetime. Tom Rinaldi on sideline.
|-
|Sunday, March 3, 2019
|Rockets vs. Celtics
|3:30 p.m.
|NBA Sunday Showcase. Israel Gutierrez on sideline.
|-
|Saturday, March 9, 2019
|Celtics vs. Lakers
|8:30 p.m.
|NBA Saturday Primetime. Lisa Salters on sideline.
|-
|Sunday, March 10, 2019
|Pacers vs. 76ers
|3:30 p.m.
|NBA Sunday Showcase. Israel Gutierrez on sideline.
|-
|Saturday, March 16, 2019
|Warriors vs. Thunder
|8:30 p.m.
|NBA Saturday Primetime. Doris Burke on sideline.
|-
|Sunday, March 17, 2019
|76ers vs. Bucks
|3:30 p.m.
|NBA Sunday Showcase. Lisa Salters on sideline.
|-
|Sunday, April 7, 2019
|Thunder vs. Timberwolves
|3:30 p.m.
|NBA Sunday Showcase. Mike Breen, Mark Jackson and Jeff Van Gundy on call. Lisa Salters worked sideline.
|-
|}

 2020s schedules 
 2019–20 schedule 
All games called by Mike Breen, Mark Jackson and Jeff Van Gundy unless otherwise noted.

 2020–21 schedule 
All games called by Mike Breen, Mark Jackson and Jeff Van Gundy with Rachel Nichols on sideline unless otherwise noted.

 2021–22 schedule 
All NBA Saturday Primetime games called by Mike Breen, Mark Jackson and Jeff Van Gundy with Lisa Salters courtside unless otherwise noted.

All 1PM ET NBA Sunday Showcase games called by Mark Jones and Doris Burke unless otherwise noted.

All 3:30PM ET NBA Sunday Showcase games called by Dave Pasch and Hubie Brown unless otherwise noted.

 2022–23 schedule 
All NBA Saturday Primetime games called by Mike Breen, Mark Jackson and Jeff Van Gundy with Lisa Salters courtside unless otherwise noted.

 Coverage 

 Overview 
Each season, ABC begins its NBA coverage with a Christmas Day tripleheader except in 2004 and 2006, when the network broadcast only one game, and 2002, 2003 and 2007–2016 when the network broadcast a doubleheader, and 2021-present when it carried an NBA Saturday Primetime on the second Saturday in December each year). From 2004 to 2006, ABC insisted on carrying a Christmas game between the Miami Heat and the Los Angeles Lakers. Since 2009, ABC's Christmas Day triple header has featured a music video featuring Mariah Carey performing her hit 1994 single "All I Want for Christmas Is You." In 2010, Carey was featured singing "Oh Santa!"

Following the initial Christmas game telecasts, Sunday afternoon coverage of regular season games begins in mid-January or early or mid February. The number of Sunday afternoon regular season games that ABC normally covers is significantly lower than what NBC broadcast during its tenure with the league. In its first season of coverage, ABC aired 14 regular-season games, in comparison to NBC's yearly average of 33 games. That number increased to 18 games in the next two seasons ( and ), and 20 games in the  season. For , ABC decreased the number of game telecasts it aired during the season to 19. In a 2002 interview with Jim Rome, NBA commissioner David Stern commented about the number of league games broadcast on ABC:

By contrast to Stern's assessment, media analysts and many fans found that the cable-heavy television deal made many games unavailable and, in addition, devalued the league. Starting with the second round of the playoffs, TNT's NBA coverage becomes exclusive, meaning that no locally produced league broadcasts can compete against the TNT telecasts (though commensurate with the move to sports rights to cable, few over-the-air local stations currently carry NBA coverage). Because of this, fans of teams in the playoffs who do not have a cable television subscription are unable to watch most playoff games. In addition, ABC's coverage is always exclusive, including during the regular season. If an ongoing game airs opposite one televised by ABC, it cannot be televised in the local market, which has the side effect of causing some games to not be aired on television at all. Sports Business Daily quoted Houston Chronicle writer Jonathan Feigen regarding the structuring of the NBA's deal with ABC:

On July 17, 2015, ESPN announced that ABC would add a series of eight of Saturday night games to its slate of broadcasts in the 2015–16 season. The first of these games will air on January 23, 2016, and will air mostly bi-weekly until the end of the regular season. As a result of this change, ABC will no longer have regular Sunday doubleheaders until 2021 (due to the length of the NBA Sunday Showcase schedule being reduced). On January 28, 2023, ABC aired its first non-Christmas NBA tripleheader, starting with the Denver Nuggets at Philadelphia 76ers, followed by the New York Knicks at Brooklyn Nets and the Los Angeles Lakers at Boston Celtics. 

In addition, unlike NBC or its preceding rightsholder CBS, ABC does not televise the NBA All-Star Game (TNT having exclusive television rights to the game itself and most other events held during All-Star Weekend). Also unlike the other networks, ABC rarely televises either of the NBA's Conference Finals series outside of game 1. TNT airs one Conference Final exclusively each year — the Western Conference Finals in 2003 and every even-numbered year since 2004 and the Eastern Conference Finals in every odd-numbered year since 2005 while ESPN will get the other. Except in 2004, 2011, 2012, 2015, 2016, 2019, and 2020 (when the network did not air any games from that round at all), ABC airs Conference Final matches – whichever one to which ESPN holds the rights in a given year – held on weekends. Due to the checkerboard schedule of the NBA Playoffs (in which games are scheduled every other day), this is limited to one game per Conference Final (until 2022), as series do not often reach a sixth or seventh game (for example, the network aired only Game 3 of the 2009 Western Conference Finals; ABC was scheduled to air the Sunday Game 7 of the series; however, the Los Angeles Lakers won the series in Game 6).

Outside of the Conference Finals, ABC generally airs playoff games throughout the first five weeks of the NBA Playoffs, in addition to a number of special prime-time playoff games, usually televised on Friday or Saturday nights. However, since 2019, Friday night first round playoff games on ABC are considered non-exclusive and may co-exist with broadcasts of regional sports networks of the teams involved.  In 2005, ABC aired the first non-cable Memorial Day game in three years, when the Phoenix Suns and San Antonio Spurs battled in Game 4 of the Western Conference Finals. Prior to the most recent NBA television deal, Memorial Day playoff games had become a yearly tradition on network television.

 Pregame show 

 Statistics 

 Graphics 

In its first year of coverage, ABC used the same graphics package as partner network ESPN, with the "score bug" being the only difference between the two networks' packages. This habit had already been put into practice by the network in regards to its NHL and college basketball coverage. However, ABC did utilize its own graphics (though they were similar in resemblance to ESPN's at the time) for college football and other sports broadcasts. For the 2003–04 season, ABC established new graphics for its NBA broadcasts, in an effort to differentiate its telecasts from ESPN's. On February 5, 2006, ABC established another new graphics package, including a horizontal scoreboard (similar to that introduced the previous fall for its final season of Monday Night Football) for the network's NBA telecasts.

ESPN, along with partner network ABC, began using graphics packages inherited by ESPN's Monday Night Football broadcast starting in 2006, featuring a score banner with an oblique red and white design. The graphics were later replaced in April 2009 with a more compact grey design, with panel-like lower thirds and a permanent "stats bar" located underneath the score and time. This was replaced in 2010 with an updated appearance based on another redesign adopted by Monday Night Football in late 2009, featuring a more metallic appearance that would later be adopted by other ESPN properties, along with the addition of yellow lights beneath a team's name to indicate remaining timeouts. At the start of the 2011–12 season, an updated version of the design was adopted with a more translucent appearance, and the addition of a "BONUS" indicator under a team's score if they have reached enough fouls to initiate the Bonus situation. Starting with the 2013 Western Conference Finals, a newly designed banner featuring 3-dimensional renditions of the team logos were used. During the 2015 NBA Finals, the graphics were updated with gold coloring, patterned backgrounds, and a modern, unified font. At the start of the 2015–16 season, however, ESPN reverted to the banner used since 2013. On May 17, 2016, the aforementioned updated graphics package from the previous year's NBA Finals returned for the 2016 Eastern Conference Finals and again for the 2016 NBA Finals.

Beginning with the 2016 NBA preseason on October 4, 2016, the graphics were updated again, this time, they are formatted for the full 16:9 letterbox presentation.  The score bar, which is significantly larger than the previous one (used since the 2013 Western Conference Finals), was given a complete overhaul, with a numerical representation of timeouts replacing the "lights" used since the 2010–11 season and a permanent "stats bar" being moved to the right side of the score bar.  The new, co-branded NBA on ESPN logo is now seen as an overlay on the upper left hand corner of the 16:9 screen.  As was the case the previous two years, the gold coloring and patterned backgrounds were used again for the 2017 NBA Finals. Notably, this is the first time that both ESPN and ABC have used the full 16:9 frame for its graphics in the networks' NBA coverage.

Starting with Saturday Primetime in 2017, live NBA game action no longer shows the ESPN identification on screen. Previously under ESPN on ABC (since 2006–07), the ESPN logo was part of the score banner, while the ABC logo was separately floating on the right side of the screen, remaining on screen during replays. The version of the new 2016–17 graphics package used on ABC replaces the ESPN logo in the score banner with several stars, while the ABC logo (still constantly on screen) anchors the right side of the banner; however for the 2017–18 season, the ESPN logo was reintroduced onto a revised version of the score banner with the ABC logo still located to the right. In addition, commercial transitions for ABC games now contain the ABC logo. It is the first time NBA games on ABC don't have ESPN identification during live action since the 2006 NBA Finals.

For the 2017–18 season, the stat bar is only shown at the beginning of the game and after commercial breaks.

 Criticisms 
One common complaint about NBA coverage on ABC is the use of unconventional camera angles, including the Floorcam and Skycam angles, used by the network throughout its coverage. Other complaints are of camera angles that appear too far away, colors that seem faded and dull, and the quieting of crowd noise so that announcers can be heard clearly (by contrast to NBC, which allowed crowd noise to sometimes drown out their announcers).

Some complaints have concerned the promotion, or perceived lack thereof, of NBA telecasts. The 2003 NBA Finals received very little fanfare on ABC or corporate partner ESPN; while subsequent Finals were promoted more on both networks, NBA-related advertisements on ABC were still down significantly from promotions on NBC. NBA promos took up 3 minutes and 55 seconds of airtime on ABC during the week of May 23, 2004 according to the Sports Business Daily, comparable to 2 minutes and 45 seconds for the Indianapolis 500. Promotions for the Indianapolis 500 outnumbered promotions for the NBA Finals fourteen-to-nine between the hours of 9:00 and 11:00 p.m. during that week.

The network was also criticized for focusing its coverage on a select number of teams, particularly the decision to broadcast a Lakers-Heat game on its Christmas Day schedule for three consecutive years. However, for 2007, ABC decided to break this tradition by instead having the Heat, for the fourth straight time, appear on Christmas Day facing the 2007 Eastern Conference Champions, the Cleveland Cavaliers. In 2008, the Boston Celtics replaced the Heat on the Christmas Day schedule, and faced the Los Angeles Lakers; and in 2009, the Cavaliers played the Lakers on Christmas Day. However, the Heat-Lakers Christmas Day special would make its return in the 2010–11 NBA season, as a result of LeBron James' recent move from the Cleveland franchise to Miami. For the 2011–12 NBA season, the Lakers and Heat played again on Christmas Day, but against separate opponents. The Lakers played the Chicago Bulls, while the Heat played the Dallas Mavericks in a rematch of the 2011 NBA Finals; both the Bulls and Mavericks made their ABC Christmas Day debuts, which also acted as the league's opening day that season due to the 2011 NBA lockout delaying the start of the season. In the case of the latter, ABC aired the pre-game championship ring and banner ceremony for the Mavericks, which marked the first time in NBA history a national broadcast network televised the ceremony.

 Music 

After the 1990s (when the NBA arguably reached its highest point in terms of popularity) many hardcore and casual fans began to associate the league with NBC, and more accurately, the network's theme music, "Roundball Rock". After ABC took over the NBA coverage from NBC, "Roundball Rock" composer John Tesh offered his iconic theme song to the new rightsholder, but ABC turned it down and told Tesh that they wanted a completely different song. Whereas NBC used "Roundball Rock" for all twelve years of its coverage, ABC ended up using at least nine themes in its first four years. Three of the themes were traditional sports themes, while six of them ("'We Got Hoops" by Robert Randolph and the Family Band, "Can't Get Enough" by Justin Timberlake, "Let's Get It Started" by The Black Eyed Peas, "Lose My Breath" by Destiny's Child, "This Is How A Heart Breaks" by Rob Thomas and "Runnin' Down a Dream" by Tom Petty and the Heartbreakers) were contemporary pieces by known artists.

For the 2006–07 NBA season, ESPN began using "Fast Break", the theme music used for ABC's NBA broadcasts since 2004, as the theme for its own NBA games. Because of the reorganization of ABC Sports under the oversight of ESPN, and its 2006 rebranding as ESPN on ABC (which calls for all sporting events aired on ABC to utilize the same production elements as ESPN's sports telecasts), this means that games broadcast on ABC will use the same theme music from previous years. In addition, ABC selected pop group The Pussycat Dolls to perform "Right Now" as the new introduction for NBA games.

For the 2008 season, "Nine Lives" by Def Leppard and Tim McGraw was used as the new intro song for ABC's game broadcasts, and was also used by ESPN during the playoffs prior to the start of each game. For the 2012 NBA Playoffs, the revised version of the 1972–73 theme was introduced, incorporating features of the current NBA players from going back from the previous year to years past during the network's tenure with the NBA.

For the 2011 NBA postseason, ESPN used an updated composition of the "Fast Break" theme music for the postseason, yet the original composition was still used for the regular season through the 2015-16 NBA season.

For the 2016-17 NBA season, ESPN used another updated composition of the "Fast Break" theme music.  This time, for the regular season, replacing the original composition that was first used by ABC since the 2004–05 season and by ESPN two seasons later. Adding Maze Featuring Frankie Beverly's " Before I Let Go" to start the court side play by play commentary.

 Team appearances 
In its first three years of coverage, ABC televised 40 playoff games, whereas NBC aired 35 in 2002 alone. The San Antonio Spurs have appeared on ABC 36 times as of 2013, the most of any other team. The second iteration of the Charlotte Hornets are the only team to have not appeared on ABC for a regular-season game (their 2016 Game 7 loss to Miami was broadcast on ABC) during the length of the current contract, whereas the San Antonio Spurs, Detroit Pistons, Los Angeles Lakers and Dallas Mavericks have appeared on the network every year since 2002. The Atlanta Hawks did appear on ABC during the network's coverage in the 1960s and 1970s, including a Christmas Day game against the Phoenix Suns in 1970. The network did not air a game involving that team until Game 7 of the 2008 1st Round Playoffs, against the Boston Celtics. The Utah Jazz's appearances have all occurred during the playoffs, with the exception of a doubleheader game that occurred on April 2, 2017, against the Spurs.

The Los Angeles Lakers had appeared in ABC's featured Christmas Day game every season from 2002 to 2016 (against the Sacramento Kings in 2002, the Houston Rockets in 2003, the Miami Heat in 2004, 2005, 2006 and 2010, the Phoenix Suns in 2007, the Boston Celtics in 2008, Cleveland Cavaliers in 2009, the Chicago Bulls in 2011 and 2014, and the Los Angeles Clippers in 2015 and 2016). After the Miami Heat, which have four Christmas Day appearances on ABC, the Sacramento Kings and the Boston Celtics are the only other teams to have had repeat appearances on the holiday.

 WNBA on ABC 

In the early years, two women's-oriented networks, Lifetime and Oxygen, also broadcast games including the first game of the WNBA. NBC showed games from 1997 to 2002 as part of their NBA on NBC coverage before the league transferred the rights to ABC/ESPN.

In June 2007, the WNBA signed a contract extension with ESPN. The new television deal ran from 2009 to 2016. A minimum of 18 games would be broadcast on ABC, ESPN, and ESPN2 each season; the rights to broadcast the first regular-season game and the All-Star Game were held by ABC. Additionally, a minimum of 11 postseason games would be broadcast on any of the three stations. Along with this deal, came the first-ever rights fees to be paid to a women's professional sports league. Over the eight years of the contract, "millions and millions of dollars" would be "dispersed to the league's teams".

 Announcers 

Brad Nessler era (2002–03)
After obtaining the NBA broadcast rights, ABC courted two main announcers from the NBA on NBC, Bob Costas and Marv Albert. After Costas (who was reportedly offered a generous deal which also included offers to do play-by-play for ESPN's Major League Baseball telecasts and feature reports for ABC News) elected to remain with NBC, and Albert signed a six-year deal with TNT, the network went with veteran broadcaster Brad Nessler to be the lead play-by-play announcer for its NBA broadcasts. Nessler, who prior to that point had not been the main voice for any professional sport on television, received a call from Marv Albert's agent, soon after getting the job. On the call, Nessler said in an interview with the Internet Movie Database:

Nessler was initially joined on the broadcasts by color commentator Bill Walton and lead sideline reporter Michele Tafoya. The team of Nessler and Walton did two broadcasts together before ABC decided that Walton needed a partner (much like he had at NBC with Steve Jones) and assigned pre-game analyst Tom Tolbert to join the team. Nessler, Walton and Tolbert called most regular season games, and every network playoff game. Other games were called by the team of Brent Musburger and Sean Elliott. After suffering the worst ratings in NBA Finals history for the 2003 series, low ratings overall, and harsh criticism, ABC decided to retool the team. More to the point, during this particular period, Brad Nessler was accused by media analysts (among them, New York Times columnist Richard Sandomir) of not knowing game strategy well, lacking rhythm and enthusiasm in his game call, not bringing out the best in his partners, too often ignoring the score and his tendency to stammer.

This was also the only year that ABC broadcast both the NBA and the Stanley Cup Finals involving teams from one market in the same year, as both the New Jersey Nets and the New Jersey Devils were in their respective league's finals. During ABC's broadcast of Game 3 between the San Antonio Spurs and the Nets in New Jersey on June 8, Nessler said that ABC was in a unique situation getting ready for both that game and Game 7 of the Stanley Cup Finals between the Devils and the Mighty Ducks of Anaheim the following night. ESPN and ABC’s lead NHL voice Gary Thorne mentioned this the following night, and thanked Nessler for promoting ABC's broadcast of Game 7 of the Stanley Cup Finals.

Al Michaels era (2003–05)
After disastrous ratings for the 2003 Finals, ABC decided to completely revamp its lead NBA broadcast team. Brad Nessler was demoted to the secondary broadcast team, where he was joined by Sean Elliott and Dan Majerle. Tom Tolbert was relegated to pre-game show duties only, and Bill Walton was removed from the network's NBA coverage altogether (however, he would remain with ESPN). Meanwhile, longtime Monday Night Football commentator Al Michaels was hired to replace Nessler as the network's lead NBA play-by-play announcer; Michele Tafoya remained as its lead sideline reporter.

Doc Rivers, a critically acclaimed analyst when he worked with Turner Sports for TNT's NBA broadcasts, became available after a 1–10 start by his Orlando Magic led to his firing as the team's coach. Rivers was hired weeks before ABC's Christmas Day season opener. He and Michaels worked that game together, one of only six they did together during the regular season (all other games Rivers worked were with Brad Nessler). During the playoffs, Michaels and Rivers worked every single telecast, including the 2004 NBA Finals, which saw significant ratings improvement.

During the 2004 NBA Playoffs, Doc Rivers was hired as head coach of the Boston Celtics. Though Rivers continued to work games with Al Michaels throughout the rest of the playoffs, ABC was forced to search for a new lead analyst for the 2004–05 season. In addition, the network dropped Brad Nessler from all NBA coverage, and did not retain Sean Elliott or Dan Majerle.

Early in the 2004–2005 season, Memphis Grizzlies coach Hubie Brown, a broadcasting legend with CBS, TBS and TNT, was forced into retirement due to health issues and was soon after hired to replace Doc Rivers as Al Michaels' broadcast booth partner. Brown called his first ABC game with Michaels on Christmas Day 2004, working the highly anticipated a Heat-Lakers game pitting those team's respective star players Shaquille O'Neal and Kobe Bryant. After that game, the two did not do a game together again until March 2005. Michaels began covering NBA games sporadically, doing two games in early March and three additional games in April. Meanwhile, Brown worked every week of ABC's coverage, broadcasting some games with veteran broadcaster Mike Breen. Michele Tafoya served as lead sideline reporter for all of the network's game broadcasts.

In addition to Hubie Brown, ABC added other known analysts to its NBA coverage. Jim Durham and Dr. Jack Ramsay both worked several games during the regular season, while Brent Musburger, John Saunders, Len Elmore and Mark Jackson were involved with others. Breen and Ramsay were the first secondary broadcast team to work a playoff game for ABC. Breen called three playoff games for the network in 2005, the most notable being Game 1 of the Western Conference Finals with Hubie Brown.

Al Michaels was criticized by the New York Post for not broadcasting the game and seeming uninterested in the NBA in general. Barry Horn of The Dallas Morning News said that Michaels was simply "not a basketball guy". Meanwhile, Bill Simmons said during the 2005 Finals that Michaels "shows up for these games, does his job, then drives home thinking, 'Only five weeks to the [NFL] Hall of Fame Game, I'm almost there!'" Another criticism that Michaels received was that he too often found himself making tediously long-winded explanations. In return, he would tend to talk over two or three possessions in a row (which Michaels seemed to be better suited for football and baseball broadcasts, for which he's better known for). The end result was that he would hardly have time to comment on the action viewers were seeing because he was so hung up on a prior subplot or storyline that he felt the audience just had to know about. Michaels was also accused of apparently lacking the kind of enthusiasm and confidence (for instance, Michaels initially reacted to Amar'e Stoudemire's block of Tim Duncan's shot during the 2005 playoffs by calling it a "great, great contested shot") expected of a main play-by-play voice.

Michaels, who by the end of his tenure on the NBA on ABC only called a total of 37 NBA games overall with ABC (a combined thirteen regular season games), did return for the NBA Finals, which scored its second-lowest rating of all time (despite the fact that it was the first Finals in eleven years to go to a seventh game). From March 7, 2004 to April 17, 2005 – including playoff games – each game Michaels called involved either the Los Angeles Lakers (whose home city Michaels resides when not broadcasting sports events) or Sacramento Kings, a total of 21 consecutive games. Game 7 of the 2005 NBA Finals would end up being Michaels' last with the NBA on ABC.

For the 2005–06 season, Al Michaels and Hubie Brown were slated to remain as ABC's main broadcast team. The duo worked that year's Christmas Day game between the Los Angeles Lakers and Miami Heat and were expected to work the NBA Finals together as well. However, that plan did not come to fruition. In 2005, the National Football League (NFL) signed a contract with NBC for the rights to the Sunday night football (a package previously held by ESPN), which in turn resulted in Monday Night Football, which Al Michaels had been broadcasting for nearly 20 years, ending its run on ABC after the league's 2005 season.

Speculation arose that Michaels would leave ABC for NBC; however, he subsequently signed a deal to remain on Monday Night Football, when it moved to ESPN in 2006. However, in the weeks leading up to Super Bowl XL, it was widely speculated that Michaels was attempting to get out of his contract with ESPN to join John Madden (who worked alongside Michaels for the previous four years on Monday Night Football as an analyst) at NBC. Michaels added fuel to the fire by refusing to state his future plans, and he could not "respond to rumors... because that would become a distraction." On February 8, 2006, ESPN announced that its Monday Night Football team would consist of Mike Tirico on play-by-play, with football analyst Joe Theismann and Tony Kornheiser as analysts. ESPN explicitly stated that Michaels would not return to either Monday Night Football broadcasts or ABC's NBA broadcasts, all but assuring Michaels' departure from ABC after 30 years, and joining Madden at NBC.

Mike Breen era (2006–present)
Michaels was replaced by Mike Breen, who became the lead broadcaster for an over-the-air NBA package for the first time in his career. Breen worked the 2006 Eastern Conference Finals and 2006 NBA Finals with Hubie Brown for both ESPN and ABC, as well as all the main games ABC broadcast that year. The promotion of Breen gave ABC its first consistent lead broadcaster since Brad Nessler, as Breen worked games every week. Breen previously had worked the Eastern Conference Finals for NBC in 2001 and 2002, as well as the Western Conference Finals for ESPN in 2005.

Many sportswriters and sports media analysts praised Breen, some for his explosive voice and excited calls on game-deciding and game-winning shots and others for the fact that, unlike his predecessor Al Michaels, he was already very familiar with broadcasting basketball games (prior to NBC and ABC, he is also working New York Knicks games on MSG Network) and was essentially a basketball lifer. Despite that, he faced some criticism from those who complained that they would prefer a more established voice, such as Marv Albert or Kevin Harlan. Hubie Brown faced criticism from writers (most notably Richard Sandomir of The New York Times) as well as bloggers and viewers.

Lisa Salters also served as the lead sideline reporter for ABC's regular-season game coverage and the NBA Finals that season, filling in for Michele Tafoya while she was on maternity leave. Salters returned to her role as its secondary sideline reporter when Tafoya returned the following year. For the secondary broadcast team, ABC reunited Bill Walton and Steve Jones for game coverage. Walton and Jones worked the Christmas Day 2005 broadcast between the San Antonio Spurs and Detroit Pistons for ABC, the first game they called together since Game 4 of the 2002 NBA Finals for NBC (NBC's last NBA telecast to date). The pair worked their first broadcast with Mike Breen, and worked the remainder of the season with Brent Musburger, Jim Durham and Mike Tirico. That team, along with the Breen-Brown duo, now often does ESPN's Wednesday or Friday game coverage, which the previous ABC announce teams rarely did.

ABC also used several SportsCenter reporters, including Tom Rinaldi, Rachel Nichols and Jeremy Schaap, for pregame and halftime features during 2006.

For the 2006–07 NBA season, ABC's sports operations were fully integrated into ESPN (rebranding the sports division as ESPN on ABC). As a result, Mark Jackson replaced Hubie Brown as ABC's lead analyst (Brown would still pair with Mike Breen on ESPN's primary broadcast team and Mike Tirico on ABC's secondary team). ABC's pre-game show, which Jackson was a part of, also began to be broadcast from the site of the main game each week (much as was the case during first season of the network's current NBA deal in 2003).

Additionally, Michele Tafoya returned as a sideline reporter, after sitting out the 2005–06 season on maternity leave. Lisa Salters returned to her role as its secondary sideline reporter the following year as Tafoya returned to her old role.

On July 9, 2007, it was announced by Dan Patrick that he would be leaving ESPN after 18 years with the network. Stuart Scott hosted ABC's pregame show for the 2007–08 season along with analysts Bill Walton and Michael Wilbon. Jeff Van Gundy also joined Mike Breen and Mark Jackson full-time, starting Christmas Day. After Walton had back problems in February, Jon Barry replaced him for the rest of the season.

Michele Tafoya left her role as NBA sideline reporter for ABC after the 2007–08 season to spend more time with her family; however, she continued to work for ESPN, primarily serving as a sideline reporter for Monday Night Football (before leaving for NBC in 2011 to serve that same position for Sunday Night Football). Doris Burke, who already served as an analyst for ESPN's NBA telecasts, replaced Tafoya as lead sideline reporter on the ABC broadcasts.

Lisa Salters serves as a substitute for Burke in the event she is on assignment or is slated to handle analyst duties for the NBA on ESPN, with Heather Cox filling in as part of the secondary announcing team for Salters, when she is working within the primary broadcast team. Cox took over the secondary role in 2012 after Salters became a full-time sideline reporter for Monday Night Football, with either Chris Broussard, J. A. Adande or Holly Rowe serving as the secondary reporter whenever Cox was assigned as the lead reporter.

, the main broadcast team currently consists of Mike Breen, Mark Jackson and Jeff Van Gundy, while the secondary broadcast team consists of Mike Tirico and Hubie Brown, with either Mark Jones, Ryan Ruocco or Dave Pasch filling in when Tirico has other commitments. The NBA Countdown studio team consists of host Sage Steele, and analysts Jalen Rose and Doug Collins. ABC's second team of Tirico and Brown also comprise the lead team for NBA Finals coverage on ESPN Radio, with Kevin Calabro subbing in for Tirico on some occasions.

Jackson briefly left the broadcast booth to serve as head coach of the Golden State Warriors from 2011 to 2014. Prior to the 2011–12 season, ABC reassigned Stuart Scott to another role while the studio team worked without a main host in a more free-flowing approach. This experiment ended prior to the 2013–14 season, when Sage Steele became the lead host of Countdown. Magic Johnson, Jon Barry, Michael Wilbon, Bill Simmons, and Chris Broussard have previously served as analysts for NBA Countdown.

For the 2016–17 season, Mark Jones replaced Mike Tirico as part of the secondary broadcast team with Hubie Brown as Tirico left for NBC. Also, Doug Collins left NBA Countdown and joined ESPN's roster of game analysts, returning to a position he previously held while working with NBC and TNT. Steele was replaced as host by Michelle Beadle during the season.

For the 2019–20 season, ABC's pregame show was completely revamped. ESPN decided to drop Beadle, who had been granted a buyout at the company, and Chauncey Billups, though he would remain with ESPN as a regular game analyst until he left the company to take a coaching job with the Los Angeles Clippers. Beadle's role would end up being split between Maria Taylor, who works ABC's college football game of the week, and Rachel Nichols, host of the popular ESPN show The Jump. Richard Jefferson and Jay Williams were brought in to replace Billups, with the network retaining Jalen Rose and Paul Pierce. Nichols will also be ABC's pregame host for the NBA Finals. ESPN also decided to replace NBA Countdown with The Jump for their NBA Saturday Primetime pregame show. NBA Countdown will remain the main pregame show for NBA Sunday Showcase.

Those plans did not continue as planned after March 8, as the NBA suspended play due to the coronavirus pandemic. Because of that, Nichols resorted to the NBA Bubble at the ESPN Wide World of Sports Complex at the Walt Disney World Resort in Orlando, FL, where the NBA restarted their season and held the Playoffs, where she eventually took Doris Burke's spot as sideline reporter for the Finals, meaning Taylor was elevated to host the NBA Finals on ABC, and Countdown being restored as ABC's pregame show.

For the 2020–21 season, Nichols was tapped to serve as sideline reporter for NBA Saturday Primetime, meaning Taylor was promoted to Nichols' spot as host, with Countdown being restored as pregame show. After he was part of an inappropriate Instagram video, ESPN quietly dropped Pierce on April 6, without replacement for the remainder of the season. Prior to the 2021 NBA Finals, Nichols was removed in favor of Malika Andrews after a video revealed of Nichols uttering racially insensitive comments towards black colleague Taylor. Soon after, Taylor departed to join NBC Sports, and Nichols was removed from all ESPN programming.

For the 2021–22 season, Lisa Salters replaced Nichols as the primary sideline reporter, and Mike Greenberg replaced Taylor on NBA Countdown along with returning analysts Michael Wilbon, Stephen A. Smith, Jalen Rose and Magic Johnson.

Mike Breen and Jeff Van Gundy missed Game 1 of the 2022 NBA Finals due to COVID-19 protocols, and Mark Jones filled in for Breen. Jones, Mark Jackson and Lisa Salters made history in Game 1 as the first all-African American broadcast team to cover an NBA Finals game.

 Television ratings 

Between 2012 and 2019, the NBA lost 40 to 45 percent of its viewership. While some of it can be attributed to "cable-cutting", other professional leagues, like the NFL and MLB have retained stable viewership demographics. The opening game of the 2020 Finals between the Los Angeles Lakers and Miami Heat brought in only 7.41 million viewers to ABC, according to The Hollywood Reporter''. That is reportedly the lowest viewership seen for the Finals since at least 1994, when total viewers began to be regularly recorded and is a 45 percent decline from Game 1 between the Golden State Warriors and Toronto Raptors, which had 13.51 million viewers a year earlier. Some attribute this decline to the political stances the league and its players are taking, while others consider load management, the uneven talent distribution between the conferences and the cord-cutting of younger viewers as the main reason for the decline.

References

External links 
ESPN's official website for coverage of the NBA
NBA.com's website for ABC's broadcast schedule
The NBA on ABC -- Then and Now
NBA News & Videos - ABC News 

1965 American television series debuts
1973 American television series endings
2002 American television series debuts
1960s American television series
1970s American television series
2000s American television series
2010s American television series
2020s American television series
American Broadcasting Company original programming
ABC Sports
ABC Radio Sports
Black-and-white American television shows
ABC
American television series revived after cancellation
ABC
1980s American radio programs
American sports radio programs
ABC radio programs